Eric's World is a children's sitcom, which aired on a number of Canadian networks in 1990–1995, and was produced by Cambium Productions, running for five seasons.

The show starred Eric Nagler, who had previously appeared on Sharon, Lois & Bram's Elephant Show. The show also featured Ashley Brown as Max, Michelyn Emelle as Andrea, Daniel DeSanto as Horace, Niki Holt as Kaley, Maggie Huculak as Marian the Librarian, Nicole Lyn as Prue and John Pattison as C.J..

Premise
Eric lives in a trailer park with his daughter Kaley, and later with his adopted son Nat. As a single parent, Eric has the help and support of friends and neighbours like Andrea and her son Max, and the very knowledgeable adventurer Marion the Librarian. All of the children had best friends, for example, Kaley's best friend was Prue. In the series, there is also a life sized puppet named C.J. who serves as Eric's manager.

Cast
 Eric Nagler As Himself
 Niki Holt as Kaley
 Nicole Lyn as Prue
 Ashley Brown as Max
 Michelyn Emelle as Andrea
 Maggie Huculak as Marion
 John Pattison as the voice and puppeteer of CJ
 Daniel DeSanto as Horace
 Kenny Vadas as Nat

Episodes

References

External links 
 

1990 Canadian television series debuts
1995 Canadian television series endings
1990s Canadian children's television series
1990s Canadian sitcoms
Canadian children's comedy television series
Canadian television shows featuring puppetry
Television shows filmed in Toronto
TVO original programming
Family Channel (Canadian TV network) original programming